The Office of the Court Administrator (abbreviated OCA) is a department of the Supreme Court of the Philippines tasked primarily with investigating judicial misconduct in the lower courts through audits and filing administrative cases against judges who they find guilty of corrupt practices, gross negligence, and/or ignorance of the law, which are then heard and ruled on by the Supreme Court en banc. Cases brought by the Court Administrator can lead to sanctions starting at warnings and fines all the way up to disbarment from the Integrated Bar of the Philippines, forfeiture of benefits, and banning from serving in any public office or government-owned corporation.

The office was established in 1975 by then-President Ferdinand Marcos; On March 1, 2022, Raul B. Villanueva was appointed as the Court Administrator who is tasked to oversee more than 2,600 judges and 25,000 court personnel.

References

External links 
 

Supreme Court of the Philippines
Judicial misconduct
Oversight and watchdog organizations